Ryan Del Monte (born September 13, 1983) is a Canadian former professional ice hockey player. He played in the American Hockey League (AHL).

Playing career
Del Monte started the 2010–11 season with the Cincinnati Cyclones. In the following season, Del Monte started the 2011–12 season in the ECHL with the Kalamazoo Wings before he was loaned and remained with the Worcester Sharks of the AHL for the duration of the year.

On June 28, 2012, Del Monte signed his first European contract on a one-year deal with German 2nd Bundesliga Starbulls Rosenheim, where he scored 10 goals, and 20 assists for 30points in 42 games with Rosenheim.

On September 5, 2013, it was announced that Del Monte had signed to play with the Kalamazoo Wings of the ECHL.

Career statistics

References

External links

1983 births
Living people
Brock Badgers ice hockey players
Canadian expatriate ice hockey players in Germany
Canadian expatriate ice hockey players in the United States
Canadian ice hockey centres
Cincinnati Cyclones (ECHL) players
Ice hockey people from Ontario
Johnstown Chiefs players
Kalamazoo Wings (ECHL) players
Lake Erie Monsters players
Rochester Americans players
Sarnia Sting players
South Carolina Stingrays players
Sportspeople from Mississauga
Starbulls Rosenheim players
Worcester Sharks players